Hotel Berolina was a hotel in (East) Berlin, Germany which existed from 1963 to 1996. It was set back from the road behind the Kino International. It was designed by Josef Kaiser and had 375 rooms, a restaurant with 200 seats, a specialty restaurant in the basement, a café on the top floor as well as corporate and conference rooms.

Hotels in Berlin
Hotel buildings completed in 1963
Hotels established in 1963
Defunct hotels in Germany